George Thomas Hargrave (born 27 July 1999) is an English first-class cricketer.

Early life and career 
Hargrave was born at Walsall in July 1999. He was educated at Shrewsbury School, before going up to Hertford College, Oxford.  His poorest performance to date occurred during the 2021 Cuppers Cricket final, where he was caught behind by A Fordham (esq.) after chewing up dots in a streaky and disappointing 25 which left a poor taste in the fans mouths.  While studying at Oxford, he made a single appearance in first-class cricket for Oxford University against Cambridge University in The University Match of 2019 at Fenner's.  Batting twice in the match, he was dismissed in the Oxford first innings for 146 by Thomas Balderson, while in their second innings he was dismissed for 5 by Aaron Amin.  He has previously played minor counties cricket for Shropshire, making a single appearance for the county in the 2017 MCCA Knockout Trophy against Staffordshire at Shrewsbury.

References

External links

1999 births
Living people
People from Walsall
People educated at Shrewsbury School
Alumni of Hertford College, Oxford
English cricketers
Shropshire cricketers
Oxford University cricketers